The Weber Formation is a geologic formation in Colorado. It preserves fossils dating back to the Late Pennsylvanian.

See also
 List of fossiliferous stratigraphic units in Colorado
 Paleontology in Colorado

References
 

Carboniferous Colorado